4257 Ubasti, provisional designation , is a stony asteroid, classified as near-Earth object of the Apollo group and as Mars-crosser, approximately 1.5 kilometers in diameter. It was discovered by American astronomer Jean Mueller at the Palomar Observatory in California on 23 August 1987. The asteroid was named for Bastet – also known as Baast, Ubaste or Ubasti – the Egyptian goddess of cats.

Orbit and classification 

Ubasti orbits the Sun at a distance of 0.9–2.4 AU once every 2 years and 1 month (772 days). Its orbit has an eccentricity of 0.47 and an inclination of 41° with respect to the ecliptic. Due to its high eccentricity, Ubasti is also a Mars-crossing asteroid. The body's observation arc begins with its official discovery observation, as no precoveries were taken and no prior identification had been made.

Close approaches 

This distance, however, is too large to make it a potentially hazardous asteroid (0.05 AU; less than 20 LD).

Physical characteristics 

Ubasti is an assumed stony S-type asteroid.

Rotation period 

As of 2017, no rotational lightcurve of Ubasti has been obtained and its rotation period remains unknown. However, the Lowell Observatory Near-Earth Asteroid Photometric Survey has measured the body's brightness variation caused by its rotation, which gave a maximum of 0.36 magnitude. This indicates that the body has a somewhat non-spherical shape.

Diameter and albedo 

According to the survey carried out by the Japanese Akari satellite, Ubasti measures 1.30 kilometers in diameter and its surface has an albedo of 0.376, while the Collaborative Asteroid Lightcurve Link assumes a standard albedo for stony asteroids of 0.20 and calculates a diameter of 1.96 kilometers based on an absolute magnitude of 15.9.

Naming 

This minor planet was named after Egyptian goddesses Bastet, who was originally the goddess of warfare, equated with the lioness war goddess, but later transformed into a major protector deity represented as a cat. The official naming citation was published by the Minor Planet Center on 21 November 1991. The discoverer dedicated this asteroid to her beloved companion, Pepper Cat (1974–1991).

References

External links 
 Asteroid Lightcurve Database (LCDB), query form (info )
 Dictionary of Minor Planet Names, Google books
 Asteroids and comets rotation curves, CdR – Observatoire de Genève, Raoul Behrend
 
 
 

004257
Discoveries by Jean Mueller
Named minor planets
19870823